Avenel is a New Jersey Transit commuter rail station on NJ Transit's North Jersey Coast Line, located in the Avenel section of Woodbridge, New Jersey. The station was rebuilt in 1940 and 1992. After receiving limited service between 1985 and 2019, service at the station was increased.

History 
From 1985 to 2019 there was no weekend service and limited weekday service, but on September 8, 2019 increased weekend service debuted at Avenel along with increased weekday service, with a further increase on November 8, 2020.

Station layout 
Avenel has two short three-car high-level side platforms on two tracks. It had been slated for closing by NJ Transit because of the excessive costs of adding elevators for handicapped access. Ramps were installed instead to each platform at their southern ends.

The station is located directly over Avenel Street, which has a staircase on its northern sidewalk going up to each platform. The staircase to the New York-bound platform is enclosed while the one to the Long Branch-bound platform is exposed alongside the overpass. At the top of the stairs, each platform has a double long bus shelter with a white domed roof and bench.

The platforms have an additional entrance/exit at their southern ends. On each side, a twisting ramp and staircase goes to the service roads of Avenel Street. A pedestrian tunnel with staircases down at each end and concrete entry portals connect the platforms. The station's only ticket machine, installed in May 2011, is located in a bus shelter along the end of the street beneath the Newark-bound platform.

References

External links

 Avenel Street entrance from Google Maps Street View

NJ Transit Rail Operations stations
Stations on the North Jersey Coast Line
Railway stations in Middlesex County, New Jersey
Woodbridge Township, New Jersey
Former Pennsylvania Railroad stations